The 1959 Toledo Rockets football team was an American football team that represented Toledo University in the Mid-American Conference (MAC) during the 1959 NCAA University Division football season. In their third and final season under head coach Harry Larche, the Rockets compiled a 2–6–1 record (0–6 against MAC opponents), finished in seventh place in the MAC, and were outscored by their opponents by a combined total of 200 to 123.

The team's statistical leaders included Dennis Wilkie with 723 passing yards, Occie Burt with 437 rushing yards, and Bob Smith with 455 receiving yards.

Schedule

References

Toledo
Toledo Rockets football seasons
Toledo Rockets football